A chair is a piece of furniture.

Chair or chairs may also refer to:

 Chair (academic), a professor, generally used to recognise academics who have significantly contributed to scholarship and research and/or progress and development of a university or of the wider community
 Chair, a type of professorship in the United Kingdom
 Endowed Chair, a type of professorship in the United States
 Chair (Polish academic department), a division of a university or school faculty
 Chair (railway), part of a railtrack fastening system
 Chairperson, or chair, the presiding officer of an organized group 
 Chair conformation, a cyclohexane molecule shape
Sedan chair, a chair carried through the streets
 Chair, a prize at an Eisteddfod
 Chair Airlines, a Swiss airline.

See also

 The Chair (disambiguation)
 Electric chair (disambiguation)
 The Chairs
 Chair Entertainment, a video game developer